The Metropolitano de Hockey Femenino is a women's field hockey competition contested by clubs from the Buenos Aires Province of Argentina. Played since 1924, it is regulated by the Buenos Aires Hockey Association (AHBA).

Formula 
The Torneo Metropolitano is one of the country's two main club competitions; the other is the Liga Nacional de Hockey (LHN) played by teams not only from Buenos Aires but from the rest of Argentina.

The championship is disputed by 14 teams grouped in a unique zone. All teams played a double round-robin tournament of 13 fixtures each (home and away). At the end of the season, the first six teams qualify for the playoffs, where two teams will be eliminated. The next stage is the semi-finals, and then the final match.

Current teams (2022)

List of champions
The chart below includes all the titles won by women's teams.

{| class="wikitable sortable" style="text-align:left"
! width= px |Season
! width= 200px |Champion
|-
| 1924 || Quilmes Girls  
|-
| 1925 || Quilmes 
|-
| 1926 || Quilmes 
|-
| 1927 || Quilmes 
|-
| 1928 || Quilmes 
|-
| 1929 || Quilmes  
|-
| 1930 || Quilmes  
|-
| 1931 || Quilmes 
|-
| 1932 || Quilmes 
|-
| 1933 || Pacific RAC  
|-
| 1934 || Arrows  
|-
| 1935 || Pacific RAC 
|-
| 1936 || Pacific RAC 
|-
| 1937 || Arrows 
|-
| 1938 || Lomas 
|-
| 1939 || Arrows  
|-
| 1940 || Arrows  
|-
| 1941|| Pacific RAC 
|-
| 1942 || Belgrano  
|-
| 1943 || CA San Isidro 
|-
| 1944 || CA San Isidro 
|-
| 1945 || Arrows  
|-
| 1946 || Belgrano 
|-
| 1947 || Pacific RAC 
|-
| 1948 || San Isidro Club 
|-
| 1949 || Belgrano  
|-
| 1950 || San Isidro Club 
|-
| 1951 || San Isidro Club 
|-
| 1952 || Quilmes 
|-
| 1953 || San Isidro Club  
|-
| 1954 || Quilmes  
|-
| 1955 || Quilmes 
|-
| 1956 || Quilmes 
|-
| 1957 || Quilmes 
|-
| 1958 || Quilmes 
|-
| 1959 || Hurling 
|-
| 1960 || Quilmes  
|-
| 1961 || Quilmes 
|-
| 1962 || Surí 
|-
| 1963 || Surí   
|-
| 1964 || Quilmes 
|-
| 1965 || Gimnasia y Esgrima (BA) 
|-
| 1966 || CA San Isidro  
|-
| 1967 || CA San Isidro  
|-
| 1968 || Banco Nación 
|-
| 1969 || CA San Isidro  
|-
| 1970 || Banco Nación 
|-
| 1971 || Atlético del Rosario 
|-
| 1972 || Hurling 
|-
| 1973 || Banco Nación 
|-
| 1974 ||  Belgrano 
|-
| 1975 ||  Atlético del Rosario 
|-
| 1976 || Buenos Aires CRC 
|-
| 1977 ||  Lomas 
|-
| 1978 || Hurling 
|-
| 1979 || Lomas 
|-
| 1980 || Buenos Aires CRC 
|-
| 1981 || Buenos Aires CRC 
|-
| 1982 || San Fernando 
|-
| 1983 || Lomas 
|-
| 1984 || Lomas 
|-
| 1985 || Lomas 
|-
| 1986 || Lomas 
|-
| 1987 || Buenos Aires CRC 
|-
| 1988 || Buenos Aires CRC 
|-
| 1989 || Lomas 
|-
| 1990 || Ferrocarril Mitre 
|-
| 1991 || Lomas 
|-
| 1992 || Lomas 
|-
| 1993 || Lomas 
|-
| 1994 || Ferrocarril Mitre 
|-
| 1995 || Ferrocarril Mitre 
|-
| 1996 || Lomas 
|-
| 1997 || Lomas 
|-
| 1998 || Ciudad 
|-
| 1999 || Ciudad 
|-
| 2000 || Ciudad 
|-
| 2001 ||  Lomas 
|-
| 2002 || San Fernando 
|-
| 2003 ||  Lomas 
|-
| 2004 ||  Ciudad 
|-
| 2005 ||  Lomas 
|-
| 2006 ||  Lomas 
|-
| 2007 || Gimnasia y Esgrima (BA) 
|-
| 2008 || Gimnasia y Esgrima (BA) 
|-
| 2009 ||  Gimnasia y Esgrima (BA) 
|-
| 2010 ||  Gimnasia y Esgrima (BA) 
|-
| 2011 ||  Gimnasia y Esgrima (BA)  
|-
| 2012 ||  Gimnasia y Esgrima (BA) 
|-
| 2013 ||  Gimnasia y Esgrima (BA) 
|-
| 2014 ||  Ciudad 
|-
| 2015 ||  Banco Provincia 
|-
| 2016 || |River Plate 
|-
| 2017 ||  Gimnasia y Esgrima (BA) 
|-
| 2018 ||  Banco Nación 
|-
| 2019 ||  Lomas 
|-
| 2020 || bgcolor=#efefef| 
|-
| 2021 ||  San Fernando

Titles by club
The teams with most titles is Lomas with 18 championships. Quilmes Girls was a team that only won one championship, the first to be played in 1924.

Notes

References

External links
 
 Metropolitano championship on Solo Hockey

1924 establishments in Argentina
Field hockey leagues in Argentina
Sports competitions in Buenos Aires
Sports leagues established in 1924
Women's field hockey leagues
Women's sports leagues in Argentina